Burnside Combustion Turbine is a light fuel oil-fired station owned by Nova Scotia Power, located in Dartmouth, Nova Scotia, Canada.

Description 

The Burnside Combustion Turbine Station consists of 132 MW light oil-fired station that operates as a secondary source.

References

External links 

 Station Description

Oil-fired power stations in Nova Scotia
Nova Scotia Power